The VI 2008 Oceania Badminton Championships was the 6th edition of the Oceania Badminton Championships. It was held in Nouméa, New Caledonia from 3 to 8 February 2008.

Medalists

Individual event 
New Zealand has won four out of five titles in the individual events. The only consolation for Australia was the men's doubles Smith and Warfe, which they won in two sets beating the New Zealand pairing of Henry Tam and Nathan Hannam. The table below gives an overview of the individual event medal winners at the 2008 Oceania Championships.

Team Event 
New Zealand team won the Oceania mixed teams event after lift the Robson Shield tournament. The Men's and Women's team event was the qualifying round of the 2008 Thomas & Uber Cup. New Zealand won the men's and women's team after beat Australia with the score 3-2 in the men's team, and 3-0 in the women's team.

References

External links 
 Individual Results
 Team Results

Oceania Badminton Championships
Oceania Badminton Championships
International sports competitions hosted by New Caledonia
Badminton in New Caledonia